Yttrium phosphate, YPO4, is the phosphate salt of yttrium. It occurs in nature as mineral xenotime.

References 

Phosphates
Yttrium compounds